Jan Müller-Wieland (born 30 March 1966 in Hamburg) is a German composer and conductor of classical music and an academic teacher. He is known for his operas.

Career 

Müller-Wieland studied at the Musikhochschule Lübeck, composition with Friedhelm Döhl, double bass with Willi Beyer and conducting with Günther Behrens. He studied composition with Hans Werner Henze in Cologne and Rome, and Oliver Knussen in the Tanglewood Music Center.

Müller-Wieland was a Stipendiat of the Villa Massimo in 1992/93. He was awarded the Hindemith Prize of the Schleswig-Holstein Musik Festival in 1993 and the Ernst von Siemens Music Composers' Prize in 2002. From 2003 he has been a member of the Freie Akademie der Künste in Hamburg.

Müller-Wieland has been a Professor for composition at the Hochschule für Musik und Theater München since 2007.

Müller-Wieland is a member of the festival A*Devantgarde.

He is married to the Austrian author .

Opera 
As of 2011, Müller-Wieland composed 14 operas. His first opera Das Gastspiel, subtitled "Cabaret Farce for singers, pianists and percussionists", a chamber opera after Frank Wedekind's Posse (farce) Der Kammersänger, was premiered at the Munich Biennale in 1992. The libretto of his opera Das Märchen der 672. Nacht (The Fairy tale of the 672nd Night) was written by his wife Birgit Müller-Wieland after a novella by Hugo von Hofmannsthal; the opera was first performed in 2000 at the Wiener Kammeroper conducted by Alexander Drcar. In 2008 his opera Aventure Faust, related to Goethe's Faust, was premiered in the Reaktorhalle in Munich München, combined with György Ligeti's "Nouvelles Aventures" for three singers and seven instrumentalist.

Chamber music premieres
His third piano trio Se solen sjunker on a Swedish song which Schubert also used was premiered on 29 June 2008 as part of the Piano Festival Ruhr at the Zeche Nordstern in Gelsenkirchen, performed by Siegfried Mauser (piano), Gottfried Schneider (violin) and Sebastian Hess (violoncello). His composition for chamber ensemble Traumbilder was commissioned by RUHR.2010, the project of the European Culture Capital, and first performed on 19 May 2010 in the Reinoldikirche Dortmund.

Selected works

Stage works

Orchestra
Poem des Morgens (1991) for large orchestra
Ballad of Ariel (2002) for violin and large orchestra

Chamber music
Ecstatic and Instinctive (1989) for two pianos and two percussionists
Schlaflied (2004) for piano trio
Se solen sjunker (2008) for piano trio

Instrumental music
Himmelfahrt for viola solo (2003)

References

Work list(pdf) from the Sikorski pages for Müller-Wieland. Retrieved 2 April 2011.

External links 
Jan Müller-Wieland website
Jan Müller-Wieland Sikorski
Jan Müller-Wieland, Hochschule für Musik und Theater München 

German opera composers
Male opera composers
German male conductors (music)
20th-century classical composers
21st-century classical composers
Academic staff of the University of Music and Performing Arts Munich
1966 births
Musicians from Hamburg
Living people
German male classical composers
Ernst von Siemens Composers' Prize winners
20th-century German composers
21st-century German composers
20th-century German conductors (music)
21st-century German conductors (music)
20th-century German male musicians
21st-century German male musicians